Junior Luke (born November 1, 1991) is a professional Canadian football defensive lineman who is currently a free agent. He was most recently a member for the Montreal Alouettes of the Canadian Football League (CFL).

University career
Luke played U Sports football with the Montreal Carabins where he was a member of the 50th Vanier Cup championship team.

Professional career

BC Lions
Luke was ranked as the 11th best player in the Canadian Football League’s Amateur Scouting Bureau final rankings for players eligible in the 2017 CFL Draft. He was selected in the first round and seventh overall by the BC Lions in the 2017 CFL Draft and signed with the team on May 24, 2017. He played for the Lions for three years in 53 games where he had 25 defensive tackles, four sacks, and one interception.

Montreal Alouettes
Luke joined the Montreal Alouettes as a free agent on February 12, 2020. However, the 2020 CFL season was cancelled and he re-signed with the Alouettes on December 17, 2020. He spent the entire 2021 season on the practice roster and was released on November 29, 2021.

References

External links
 Montreal Alouettes profile

1991 births
Living people
BC Lions players
Canadian football defensive linemen
Montreal Alouettes players
Montreal Carabins football players
Players of Canadian football from Quebec
Canadian football people from Montreal